Sidyma is a genus of moths in the subfamily Arctiinae. The genus was erected by Francis Walker in 1856.

Species
 Sidyma apicalis Moore, 1878
 Sidyma albifinis Walker, 1856

References

Lithosiini
Moth genera